The Royal Aircraft Factory A.E.2 (Armed or Armoured Experimental) was a proposed British armoured ground attack aircraft of the First World War.

Design
The A.E.2m, conceived in 1917, was intended to be an armoured nacelle tractor biplane design. The wingspan of the aircraft would have been 42 feet 7 inches. However, the design never entered the hardware phase.

References

1910s British attack aircraft
AE2
Single-engined tractor aircraft
Biplanes